Veshareh may refer to:

 Veshareh, Isfahan
 Veshareh, Qom